Lilli Schwarzkopf (born 28 August 1983 in Novopokrovka, Kirghiz SSR) is a German heptathlete.

Her first major global competition was the 2005 World Championships in Athletics, where she finished in 13th place. She won the bronze medal at the 2006 European Athletics Championships in Gothenburg. She followed this up on the world stage with a fifth-place finish at the 2007 World Championships and eighth place at the 2008 Summer Olympics. She failed to finish the heptathlon at the 2009 World Championships in Athletics in Berlin and chose to omit the 2010 European Athletics Championships to focus on her studies but came back to place sixth at the 2011 World Championships in Daegu.

Schwarzkopf won the silver medal in the heptathlon at the 2012 Summer Olympics. Initially after the 800 metres, Schwarzkopf was disqualified for breaking lane, but this later turned out to be a mistake, Kristina Savitskaya in the neighbouring lane having done so, and Schwarzkopf was re-instated.

References

External links 

  
 
 
 
 

1983 births
Living people
People from Chüy Region
Kyrgyzstani people of German descent
Citizens of Germany through descent
German heptathletes
Athletes (track and field) at the 2008 Summer Olympics
Athletes (track and field) at the 2012 Summer Olympics
Olympic athletes of Germany
Olympic silver medalists for Germany
European Athletics Championships medalists
Medalists at the 2012 Summer Olympics
Olympic silver medalists in athletics (track and field)